The 1982 Swedish motorcycle Grand Prix was the tenth round of the 1982 Grand Prix motorcycle racing season. It took place on the weekend of 5–8 August 1982 at the Scandinavian Raceway in Anderstorp, Sweden.

Classification

500 cc

References

Swedish motorcycle Grand Prix
Swedish
Motorcycle Grand Prix